Mitch Finley (born December 17, 1945) is an American author who writes on religious and Catholic subjects. 

Finley has written over 30 books and has won 11 Catholic Press Awards, along with an Excellence in Writing Award from the American Society of Journalists and Authors.

Biography
Finley was born in 1945 in La Grande, Oregon. In 1964, he graduated from DeSales Catholic High School in Walla Walla, Washington.  After graduation, Finley enlisted in the U.S. Navy.  He received an honorable discharge in 1968 as a petty officer second class.  Finley says that he "put in four years in the Navy without serving even one day aboard ship; it was all shore duty."  

After the Navy, Finley entered the Brothers of the Holy Cross three-month candidacy program, then located at Saint. Francis High School in Mountain View, California,  During this time, Finley also attended Santa Clara University as an English major. In January 1969, Flnley completed the Holy Cross Brothers' novitiate in Valatie, New York.  The community then sent him to St. Edward's University in Austin, Texas, for one semester.

Finley returned to the Brothers' community at St. Francis High School, where he re-enrolled at Santa Clara as a religious studies major. In November 1972, he left the Holy Cross Brothers.  In May 1973, Finley graduated from Santa Clara, earning a Bachelor of Religious Studies degree 

On March 9, 1974. Finley and Kathleen Hickey were married. The wedding took place in the student chapel of Gonzaga University, Kathleen Hickey's alma mater.  In 1976, he earned an Master of Theology degree from Marquette University . The couple has three sons.

Books 
The Seeker's Guide to Being Catholic
The Ten Commandments: Timeless Challenges for Today
The Seven Gifts of the Holy Spirit
The Joy of Being Catholic
A Man's Guide to Being Catholic
The Seeker's Guide to Saints 
Season of Promises
Christian Families In the Real World: Reflections On a Spirituality for the Domestic Church, written with Kathy Finley
Your One-Stop Guide to Mary
Prayer for People Who Think Too Much: A Guide to Everyday, Anywhere Prayer from the World's Faith Traditions
Saint Anthony and Saint Jude: True Stories of Heavenly Help
The Joy of Being a Eucharistic Minister
The Catholic Virtues: Seven Pillars of a Good Life
The Corporal & Spiritual Works of Mercy: Living Christian Love and Compassion
It's Not the Same Without You: Coming Home to the Catholic Church
Everybody Has a Guardian Angel
The Joy of Being a Lector
Catholic is Wonderful!
Surprising Mary
You Are My Beloved: Meditations on God's Steadfast Love
Your Family in Focus: Appreciating What You Have, Making It Even Better
What Faith is Not
Season of New Beginnings
Let's Begin with Prayer: 130 Prayers for Middle and High Schools
The Saints Speak to You Today: 365 Daily Reminders
The Gospel Truth
Catholic Spiritual Classics
Whispers of God's Love: Touching the Lives of Loved Ones After Death
101 Ways to Happiness: Nourishing Body, Mind, and Soul
Key Moments in Church History
The Rosary Handbook: A Guide for Newcomers, Old-Timers, and Those In Between
The Patron Saints Handbook

References

External links
 mitchandkathyfinley.com

American male writers
Living people
1945 births
People from La Grande, Oregon